Eskdale is a glacial valley and civil parish in the western Lake District National Park in Cumbria, England.  It forms part of the Borough of Copeland, and in 2001 had a population of 264, increasing to 304 at the 2011 Census.
One of the Lake District's most popular tourist attractions, the Ravenglass and Eskdale Railway, runs through the valley, though along with other western valleys of the Lake District, Eskdale is notably quieter during the high summer season than the more accessible eastern areas.

Topography
The River Esk flows through the valley to its estuary at Ravenglass.  The valley is notable in being one of few major valleys in the Lake District not to have its own lake, although several tarns are perched above the valley sides.

The main access to the valley is from the western end; however, there is also a steep pass with a motor road leading out of the valley to the east over Hardknott Pass, as well as a road with beautiful views leading southwards over Birker Fell to the village of Ulpha in the Duddon Valley.

Alfred Wainwright in his guide "Walks from Ratty" describes Eskdale as "One of the loveliest of Lakeland's valleys, descends from the highest and wildest mountains in the district to the Sands of Ravenglass in a swift transition from bleak and craggy ridges to verdant woodlands and pastures watered by a charming river." Upper Eskdale is a remote wilderness surrounded by Sca Fell, Scafell Pike, Ill Crag, Esk Pike, Bow Fell and Crinkle Crags; the Woolpack walk takes in this classic horseshoe.

Governance
Eskdale is within the Copeland UK Parliamentary constituency and the North West England European Parliamentary constituency. Trudy Harrison is the Member of parliament.

Before Brexit, it was in the North West England European Parliamentary Constituency.

Historical districts
The former Eskdale ward of north eastern Cumberland was named after the River Esk in the Scottish Borders, whereas the valley described in this article was located in the former ward of Allerdale Above Derwent which is the present-day local council district of Copeland.

June 2010 shootings

The area became one of the locations involved in a killing spree perpetrated by 52-year-old taxi driver Derrick Bird, who shot and killed twelve people and wounded eleven others. Several of the wounded victims were shot in Eskdale and the surrounding area.

In Literature
In a note to her poetical illustration  (Fisher's Drawing Room Scrap Book, 1836) to a painting by G. Pickering, Letitia Elizabeth Landon remarks on the hospitality of the 'estatesmen' of this district.

Eskdale and Rafnglass (modern Ravenglass) feature in Rosemary Sutcliff's final novel (1992) Sword Song, set in the 9th century.

See also

Listed buildings in Eskdale, Cumbria

References

External links
Cumbria County History Trust: Eskdale and Wasdale (nb: provisional research only – see Talk page)
 Eskdale website
 The Cumbria Directory - Eskdale

Lake District
Borough of Copeland
Civil parishes in Cumbria
Valleys of Cumbria